Emmanuel Matuta La Nkenda Nosa (born 22 February 2002) is a Belgian professional footballer who plays as a midfielder for Dutch club Groningen.

Club career
On 20 January 2022, Matuta signed a contract with Dutch club Groningen until the summer of 2026.

International career
Born in Belgium, Matuta is of Congolese descent. He is a youth international for Belgium.

Career statistics

Club

References

2002 births
Living people
Belgian people of Democratic Republic of the Congo descent
Sportspeople from Mechelen
Footballers from Antwerp Province
Belgian footballers
Association football midfielders
Belgium youth international footballers
K.V. Mechelen players
PSV Eindhoven players
Jong PSV players
FC Groningen players
Eerste Divisie players
Belgian expatriate footballers
Belgian expatriate sportspeople in the Netherlands
Expatriate footballers in the Netherlands